Melyane Island is the southernmost of Dunbar Islands off Varna Peninsula, Livingston Island in the South Shetland Islands.  The feature is ice-free, extending 280 m in southeast-northwest direction and 90 m wide.  The area was visited by early 19th century sealers.

The island is named after the settlement of Melyane in Northwestern Bulgaria.

Location
British mapping in 1968 and Bulgarian mapping in 2009.

Maps
 Livingston Island to King George Island.  Scale 1:200000.  Admiralty Nautical Chart 1776.  Taunton: UK Hydrographic Office, 1968.
 L.L. Ivanov. Antarctica: Livingston Island and Greenwich, Robert, Snow and Smith Islands. Scale 1:120000 topographic map. Troyan: Manfred Wörner Foundation, 2009.  (Second edition 2010)
Antarctic Digital Database (ADD). Scale 1:250000 topographic map of Antarctica. Scientific Committee on Antarctic Research (SCAR). Since 1993, regularly upgraded and updated.

References
 Bulgarian Antarctic Gazetteer. Antarctic Place-names Commission. (details in Bulgarian, basic data in English)
 Melyane Island. SCAR Composite Antarctic Gazetteer.

External links
 Melyane Island. Copernix satellite image

Islands of the South Shetland Islands
Bulgaria and the Antarctic